The members of the 7th Manitoba Legislature were elected in the Manitoba general election held in July 1888. The legislature sat from August 28, 1888, to June 27, 1892.

The Liberals led by Thomas Greenway formed the government.

John Norquay served as Leader of the Opposition until his death in 1889. Rodmond Roblin was leader of the opposition from 1890 to 1892.

On March 31, 1890, the legislative assembly enacted the Public Schools Act of 1890 which removed public funding for Catholic and Protestant denominational schools and established a tax-funded non-denominational public school system. On the same date, the assembly enacted the Official Language Act, making English the sole language of records, minutes and Manitoba government laws. This removed the rights granted to French-speaking Manitobans under the Manitoba Act of 1870.

William Winram served as speaker for the assembly until his death in February 1891. Samuel Jacob Jackson succeeded Winram as speaker.

There were five sessions of the 7th Legislature:

John Christian Schultz was Lieutenant Governor of Manitoba.

Members of the Assembly 
The following members were elected to the assembly in 1888:

Notes:

By-elections 
By-elections were held to replace members for various reasons:

Notes:

References 

Terms of the Manitoba Legislature
1888 establishments in Manitoba
1892 disestablishments in Manitoba